Ahmadabad (also Romanized as Aḩmadābād; also known as Balūchābād and Sāzemān-e Balūchābād) is a village in Shirang Rural District, Kamalan District, Aliabad County, Golestan Province, Iran. At the 2006 census, its population was 614, in 125 families.

References 

Populated places in Aliabad County